The voiceless palatal lateral affricate  is a type of consonantal sound, used in some spoken languages. There are two ways it can be represented: either extIPA  or strict IPA .

Features

Features of the voiceless alveolar lateral affricate:

Occurrence
The sound occurs in Hadza and, as a palatal lateral ejective affricate (see), in Dahalo.

References

Affricates
Lateral consonants
Pulmonic consonants
Voiceless oral consonants
Palatal consonants